The giant forest genet (Genetta victoriae), also known as the giant genet, is a genet species endemic to the Congo Basin. As it is considered as widely distributed and common, it is listed as Least Concern on the IUCN Red List.

Characteristics 
The giant genet has a yellowish white short and thick fur with numerous black spots. It is whitish on top of the muzzle and between the eyes. 
.

References

giant forest genet
Mammals of the Democratic Republic of the Congo
Mammals of Rwanda
Fauna of Central Africa
giant forest genet
giant forest genet